Japrería (Yapreria) is a Cariban language of Venezuela.

Phonology 
The orthography, if different from the IPA, is represented in angled brackets.
/ʋ/ is labiodental, while /m, p/ are bilabial.

References

Languages of Venezuela
Cariban languages